This is a list of the highest bridges in the United States by height over land or water. Height in this list refers to the distance from the bridge deck to the lowest point on the land, or the water surface, directly below. A bridge's deck height is greater than its clearance below, which is measured from the bottom of the deck structure, with the difference being equal to the thickness of the deck structure at the point with the greatest clearance below. Official figures for a bridge's height are often provided only for the clearance below, so those figures may be used instead of actual deck height measurements. For bridges that span tidal water, the clearance below is measured at the average high water level.

Note that the following types of bridges are not included in this list: demolished high bridges; historic high bridges such as those over reservoirsregardless of current reservoir levelsthat were filled after the bridge was complete, unless the dam has since been removed; and vertical-lift bridges, even those with raised span heights greater than this list's minimum height.

The clearance below required under bridges for the largest shipscontainer ships, ocean liners and cruise shipsis around  so there are often bridges with approximately that height located in coastal cities with bays or inlets, such as New York City's Verrazano-Narrows Bridge and San Francisco's Golden Gate Bridge.

List of bridges

Gallery
The ten highest bridges in the United States:

See also
 
 
 
 List of highest bridges
 List of longest bridges
 List of tallest bridges

Notes

References

External links
 HighestBridges.com
 Structurae.net

Bridges by height
Height
Bridges